Kihei may refer to:

Kihei, Hawaii, a place in Maui County, Hawaii, U.S.
Kihei Clark (born 2000), a Filipino-American college basketball player
, Japanese cyclist
 Kihei, one of the Hiruma Brothers, characters in Rurouni Kenshin

See also

Kiheitai

Japanese masculine given names